Genevieve Edna Apaloo is a Ghanaian career Diplomat and Ghana's current Ambassador to Japan. Genevieve was once acting Head of Mission of the Embassy of Ghana in Washington DC, United States of America, where she was posted as Head of Chancery in October 2019.

Early life and education
Genevieve attended the University of Ghana, Legon and was awarded a bachelor's degree in modern languages, with combined honors in French & Spanish. She further pursued a master's degree in Arts degree in International Affairs from the Legon Centre for International Affairs and Diplomacy in the University of Ghana.

She holds a professional certificate in 'Peace and Stability in West Africa and the Sahel', a course she took in the Netherlands, European Training Programme on Security Policy in Geneva, Switzerland and Negotiations for Peace Operations in Accra, Ghana.

Career
Genevieve was appointed by President Nana Addo-Dankwa Akufo Addo to be Ghana's Ambassador to Japan in January, 2022. Prior to being named as an ambassador she was a Foreign Service Officer at the Ministry of Foreign Affairs in Ghana with over 24 years experience.

Genevieve is a career Diplomat who before her appointment as Ambassador, served in Washington DC, USA. She has also served in Paris, Togo, Nigeria and the Equatorial Guinea.

References

Living people
Year of birth missing (living people)
University of Ghana alumni
Ghanaian women ambassadors
Ambassadors of Ghana to Japan